The Rotterdam International Open was a golf tournament on the Challenge Tour in 2005. It was played at Golfclub Broekpolder in Vlaardingen, Netherlands.

Winners

References

External links
Coverage on the Challenge Tour's official site

Former Challenge Tour events
Golf tournaments in the Netherlands
Sports competitions in South Holland
Sport in Vlaardingen